Yusuf al-Azma Square ( / ALA-LC: sāḥat Yūsuf al-‘Aẓmah), also called al-Muhafaza Square, is an important square in central Damascus, Syria. Named after the late minister of war Yusuf al-Azma where his statue stands in the middle of the square. The municipality of Damascus is located on the square, along with other official and commercial buildings, including Cham Palace Hotel.

In 2007, the square was rehabilitated by paving it with black basalt stone, planting medians with flowers, bitter orange trees on all roads leading to it, paving the square with lime stone, and changing the system of water fountains.

See also
 Damascus
 Yusuf Al-Azmah
 Battle of Maysalun

References

Squares in Damascus